Coleophora derbendella is a moth of the family Coleophoridae.

References

derbendella
Moths described in 1994